Kyoko Iriye Selden (入江, 恭子; 1936–2013) was a Japanese scholar of Japanese language and literature and a translator.

Biography 
Kyoko Iriye was born in Tokyo. Her father was a journalist reporting from Paris and Shanghai, and her mother was an English teacher. 
She attended Seikei High School, and wrote a thesis on Wordsworth at the University of Tokyo, before studying English Literature on a Fulbright Scholarship at Yale University. She taught at Cornell University for twenty-five years, and was a literary translator. She was married to Mark Selden, with whom she had three children and four grandchildren.

Selected publications 
Translations into English of Fiction, History, Biography, Early Childhood Education, and Art
 Kodaira Takashi (ed.), Tenrō haiku no eiyaku: Seishi, Toshio, Ayako (Haiku from the Tenrō School in English Translation: Seishi, Toshio, Ayako) (Yokohama: Shumpūsha, 2014) - translated by Alfred H. Marks and Kyoko Selden. 
 Suzuki Shin’ichi, Nurtured by Love. Revised edition (Van Nuys, CA: Alfred Music Publishing, 2013) - translated by Kyoko Selden with Lili Selden 
 Cho Kyo, The Search for the Beautiful Woman: A Cultural History of Japanese and Chinese Beauty (Lanham, MD: Rowman & Littlefield, 2012)
 Tanaka Shigeki, Everything Depends on How We Raise Them: Educating Young Children by the Suzuki Method (Miami: Summy-Birchard, 2002)
 Honda Katsuichi, Harukor: An Ainu Woman’s Tale (Berkeley: University of California Press, 2000).
 Tomioka Taeko, The Funeral of a Giraffe: Seven Stories of Tomioka Taeko (Armonk, NY: M. E. Sharpe, 1999) - translated by Kyoko Selden and Noriko Mizuta.
 Kayano Shigeru, Our Land Was a Forest: An Ainu Memoir (Boulder, CO: Westview Press, [1994] 1996) - translated by Kyoko Selden and Lili Selden.
 Suzuki Shin’ichi, Young Children’s Talent Education and Its Method (Miami: SummyBirchard, 1996)
 Selden, Kyoko and Noriko Mizuta (eds), Japanese Women Writers: Twentieth Century Short Fiction (Armonk, NY: M.E. Sharpe [1982] 1991) - edited and translated with Noriko Mizuta.
 Selden, Mark and Kyoko Selden (eds), The Atomic Bomb: Voices from Hiroshima and Nagasaki (Armonk, NY: M. E. Sharpe, 1989)
 Shimizu Yoshiaki (ed.), Japan: The Shaping of Daimyo Culture, 1185-1868 (Washington, D.C.: National Gallery of Art, Washington, 1989.
 Suzuki Shin’ichi. Talent Education for Young Children. New Albany, IN: World-Wide Press, 1986)
 Honda Masaaki, Shinichi Suzuki: Man of Love (Princeton: Birch Tree Group, 1984)
 Suzuki Shin’ichi, Where Love Is Deep: The Writing of Shin’ichi Suzuki (New Albany, IN: World-Wide Press, 1982)

 The Kyoko Iriye Selden Memorial Translation Prize 
Also known as the Kyoko Selden Translation Prize, this was established in 2014, with contributions from colleagues and friends, to honor Kyoko Iriye Selden's scholarly legacy. The prize is awarded to translations that are at the unpublished stage, to support and encourage translation and publication  of Japanese language materials across a broad range.

2021 Winners
 Excerpts from Shōkenkō 蕉堅稿: The Selected Poems of Zekkai Chūshin 絶海中津 (1336-1405), by Zekkai Chūshin (1336-1405) - translated by Paul Atkins
 "A Dosimeter on the Narrow Road to Oku" (線量計と奥の細道, 2018), by Durian Sukegawa (ドリアン助川) - translated by Alison Watts
2020 Competition cancelled
2019 Winner
 "The Maiden's Betrayal" (Otome no mikkoku, 2010), Akiko Akazome - translated by Michelle Kyoko Crowson
2018 Winners
 "A Famous Flower in Mountain Seclusion" (Sankan no meika, 1889), by Nakajima Shōen - translated by Dawn Lawson
 "An Artificial Heart" (Jinkō Shinzō, 1926), by Kosakai Fuboku - translated by Max Zimmerman
Honorable Mention: Chapter Four of Ishimure Michiko's historical novel about the Shimabara Rebellion, Birds of Spirit (Anima no tori, 1999) - translated by Bruce Allen
2017 Winners
 "Tale of the Enchanted Sword" (妖剣記聞, Yōken Kibun, 1920), by Izumi Kyōka - translated by Nina Cornyetz
 "The Torrent" (奔流, Hon’ryū, 1943), by Taiwanese writer Wang Changxiong  (王昶雄, also known by his Japanese name, Ō Chōyū) - translated by Erin Brightwell
2016 Winner
 "Not of Color" (Hishoku), by Ariyoshi Sawako - translated by Polly Barton
2015 Winner 
 "Muddy River" (Doro no kawa), by Miyamoto Teru - translated by Andrew Murakami-Smith
2014 Winners 
 "Sagoromo" (Sagoromo monogatari), by Rokujo no Saiin Senji (1039-1036) - translated by David Pearsall Dutcher
 "So Happy to See Cherry Blossoms" (Mankai no sakura ga mirete ureshii na, 2012), by Madoka Mayuzumi - translated by Hiroaki Sato and Nancy Sato

 Further reading 
 Obituary in The New York Times, 14 Feb 2013.
 "Selected Works of Kyoko Selden", Review of Japanese Culture and Society'', Vol. 27, Special Issue 2015, pp. 279–284. Selected Works by Kyoko Selden

References 

Japanese–English translators
English–Japanese translators
Literary translators
1936 births
2013 deaths